Muncy Junior Senior High School is located at 200 W Penn Street, Muncy, Pennsylvania. In 2016, Muncy Junior Senior High School reported an enrollment of 435 pupils in grades 7th through 12th. It is part of the Muncy School District.

High school students can attend the Lycoming Career and Technical Center for training in the building trades, drafting & design careers, criminal justice careers, allied health careers, culinary arts and other careers. The Muncy School District contracts with the BLaST Intermediate Unit #17 for services such as psychological testing, occupational and physical therapy services.

Extracurriculars
The Muncy School District offers a wide variety of clubs, activities and sports.

Sports
The district funds:

Boys
Baseball - AA
Basketball - AA
 Football - A
Soccer - A
Tennis - AA
Wrestling - AA

Girls
Basketball - A
Field hockey - A
Soccer - A
Softball - A
Tennis - AA

Junior high school sports

Boys
Basketball
Football
Wrestling 

Girls
Basketball
Field hockey
Softball

According to PIAA directory July 2016

References

Public high schools in Pennsylvania
Schools in Lycoming County, Pennsylvania
Susquehanna Valley